Agnes Ward White (1857–1943) was the wife of former West Virginia Governor Albert B. White and served as that state's First Lady, 1901–1905.  She was born in 1857 at Marietta, Ohio. In 1879, she married Albert B. White.  The Whites lived at Parkersburg, West Virginia, where Albert was publisher of the State Journal.  She was one of the most private first ladies and shunned the role of hostess.  After leaving the office, the Whites returned to Parkersburg, where she died in 1943.

References

1857 births
1943 deaths
People from Marietta, Ohio
First Ladies and Gentlemen of West Virginia
People from Parkersburg, West Virginia